The Ozone Disco fire in Quezon City, Philippines, broke out at 11:35 pm Philippine Standard Time on March 18, 1996, leaving at least 162 people dead. It is officially acknowledged as the worst fire in Philippine history, and among the 10 worst nightclub fires in the world.

History
Ozone Disco was a popular spot in Quezon City for students and young professionals in the mid-’90s. It was located near the 11th World Scout Jamboree Memorial Rotonda along Timog Avenue. It was opened in 1991 by Segio Orgaoow. Its building had previously housed a jazz club named "Birdland". The disco was operated by Westwood Entertainment Company, Inc.

Incident

The fire broke out just before midnight on March 18, 1996. At the time of the fire, it was estimated that there were around 350 patrons and 40 club employees inside Ozone Disco, though it had been approved for occupancy for only 35 people. Most of the club guests were high school and college students attending graduation or end-of-the-school-year celebrations. Survivors reported seeing sparks flying inside the disc jockey's booth shortly before midnight, followed by smoke which they thought was part of the DJ's party plan. Another survivor added that after about 15 seconds of smoke, the electrical systems of the disco shut down; flames quickly became visible.

Many of the bodies were discovered along the corridor leading to the only exit, piled up waist-high. Quezon City officials were quoted as saying that the club's emergency exit was blocked by a new building next door, and that there was no proper fire exit installed. It was also reported that the exit had been locked from the outside by the club's security guards, who had thought that a riot had taken place.

Casualties

The final death count was reported as between 160 and 162 people, the latter being the figure cited by the trial court that heard the ensuing criminal case. In addition, at least 95 people were injured. The death toll was one of the worst ever for a nightclub fire, though it was subsequently surpassed by the República Cromañón nightclub fire.

Investigation and aftermath

Six people involved with Westwood Entertainment were tried before the courts for criminal charges of "reckless imprudence resulting in multiple homicide and multiple serious injuries". On March 16, 2001, the president of Westwood Entertainment, Hermilo Ocampo, and the corporation's treasurer, Ramon Ng, were found guilty by a Quezon City trial court and sentenced to a four-year prison term, and fined 25 million pesos each. They and their co-accused (who were acquitted) were also ordered to indemnify the families of the deceased 150,000 pesos, and 100,000 pesos to the injured. The trial court concluded that Ocampo and Ng failed to provide fire exits and sprinklers inside the establishment, that the fire extinguishers they placed were defective, and that the lone exit was through a small door that swung inward and did not meet the standard set by the building code. A former employee who was among the survivors of the fire has claimed that the inward swinging doors were installed because it was good feng shui.

In November 2001, twelve officials of the Quezon City government were charged before the Sandiganbayan for reckless imprudence resulting in multiple homicides and multiple serious injuries. They were accused of allowing Ozone Disco to secure a certificate of annual inspection in 1995 "despite the inadequacy, insufficiency and impropriety of the documents submitted by the owners". In 2007, one of the twelve – the former city engineer and building official of Quezon City, Alfredo Macapugay – was discharged from criminal and civil liability after the Sandiganbayan concluded that he had no hand in the issuance of the necessary permits to Ozone Disco management.

On November 20, 2014, seven officials of the Quezon City government were found guilty under the Philippines' anti-graft and corrupt practices law by the country's anti-graft court Sandiganbayan.  They were held liable for negligence in connection with the approval of the building permit and issuance of certificates of occupancy for the company which owned Ozone. The club's owners were also found to be liable. The court affirmed its decision in April 2015.

Former site and developments 
The structure, which housed the Ozone Disco, remained standing in Timog Avenue, Quezon City but was not commercially used for over 20 years after the incident. For a few years after the incident, there was a makeshift memorial on the site featuring photographs of the victims. This has since been dismantled, and no marker or official memorial commemorates the incident or its victims.

In March 2015, a week before the 19th anniversary of the tragedy, the Ozone Disco building was finally demolished. Relatives of the victims still visit the site. As of October 2016, the former location of the Ozone Disco Club is currently occupied by a branch of the rice porridge chain GoodAh!!!, co-owned by television host Boy Abunda.

In media
 This incident was featured on two ABS-CBN shows:
 The Philippine reality crime and investigative documentary show Calvento Files, revisited the case in an episode, titled Mga Biktima ng Ozone, aired in March 29, 1996.
 Horror docudrama series Nginiig, featured the case during the Jericho Rosales era.
 The incident was featured twice on GMA Network shows: 
 The October 2, 2008 episode of the public affairs docudrama program Case Unclosed featured the incident and its aftermath as the pilot episode, directed by Adolfo Alix, Jr. Two days before the premiere of Case Unclosed, on September 29, 2008, then-Quezon City Mayor Feliciano Belmonte, Jr. father to incumbent Quezon City mayor Joy Belmonte, released an ordinance that requires the owners of entertainment establishments to use swing-in/swing-out doors.
 Lihim ng Gabi also featured the incident in one of its episodes
 The fire is the subject of the song "OZONE (Itulak ang Pinto)" from Unique Salonga's album Grandma.

See also

 List of nightclub fires
 Luoyang Christmas fire December 25, 2000; Luoyang, People's Republic of China; 309 dead
 Manor Hotel fire – second worst fire in the Philippines, happened in August 2001
 Kentex slipper factory fire – third worst fire in the Philippines, happened in May 2015

References

External links
 

1996 disasters in the Philippines
1996 fires in Asia
Fire disasters involving barricaded escape routes
Fires in the Philippines
History of Metro Manila
Man-made disasters in the Philippines
March 1996 events in Asia
Nightclub fires
Urban fires in Asia